{{Infobox UK place
| gaelic_name                      = An Leargaidh Ghallda <ref>[http://www.ainmean-aite.org/database.asp?intent=details&id=530/Ainmean-Àite na h-Alba ~ Gaelic Place-names of Scotland]</ref>
| official_name                    = Largs
| type                             = Town
| static_image_name                = DPP 00226.JPG
| static_image_caption             = Part of Largs seafront showing part of the town centre of Largs
| static_image_width               = 260px
| population                       = 
| population_ref                   =
| unitary_scotland                 = North Ayrshire
| lieutenancy_scotland             = Ayrshire and Arran
| constituency_westminster         = North Ayrshire and Arran
| constituency_scottish_parliament = Cunninghame North
| country                          = Scotland
| coordinates                      = 
| os_grid_reference                = NS203592
| map_type                         =
| post_town                        = LARGS
| postcode_district                = KA30
| postcode_area                    = KA
| dial_code                        = 01475
| edinburgh_distance_mi            = 66
| london_distance_mi               = 354
| website                          = 
}}

The original name means "the slopes" (An Leargaidh) in Scottish Gaelic.

A popular seaside resort with a pier, the town markets itself on its historic links with the Vikings and an annual festival is held each year in early September. In 1263 it was the site of the Battle of Largs between the Norwegian and the Scottish armies. The National Mòd has also been held here in the past.

History
There is evidence of human activity in the vicinity of Largs which can be dated to the Neolithic era. The Haylie Chambered Tomb in Douglas Park dates from c. 3000 BC.

Largs evolved from the estates of North Cunninghame over which the Montgomeries of Skelmorlie became temporal lords in the seventeenth century. Sir Robert Montgomerie built Skelmorlie Aisle in the ancient kirk of Largs in 1636 as a family mausoleum. Today the monument is all that remains of the old kirk.

From its beginnings as a small village around its kirk, Largs evolved into a busy and popular seaside resort in the nineteenth century. Large hotels appeared and the pier was constructed in 1834. It was not until 1895, however, that the railway made the connection to Largs, sealing the town's popularity.

It also became a fashionable place to live in and several impressive mansions were built, the most significant of which included 'Netherhall', the residence of William Thomson, Lord Kelvin, the physicist and engineer.

Largs has historical connections much further back, however. It was the site of the Battle of Largs in 1263, in which parts of a Scottish army attacked a small force of Norwegians attempting to salvage ships from a fleet carrying the armies of King Magnus Olafsson of Mann and the Isles and his liege lord King Haakon IV of Norway, beached during a storm. The Norwegians and islemen had been raiding the Scottish coast for some time, and the Scots under Alexander III had been following the fleet, attempting to catch its raiding parties. The outcome of this confrontation is uncertain, as both sides claim victory in their respective chronicles and sagas and the only independent source of the war fails to mention the battle at all. The battle was followed soon after by the death of the 59 year old King Haakon in Bishop's Palace on Orkney. Following the king's demise, his more lenient son Magnus VI of Norway agreed the Treaty of Perth in 1266, under which the Hebrides were sold to Scotland, as was the Isle of Man after the demise of Magnus Olafsson.

The Largs war memorial dates from 1920 and was designed by Sir Robert Lorimer.

During World War II, the Hollywood Hotel was designated HMS Warren, which was Headquarters, Combined Training. A conference was held there between 28 June 1943 and 2 July 1943, code name RATTLE, under Lord Louis Mountbatten. It was known as the "Field of the Cloth of Gold" (named after a famous historic event) because of the number of high-ranking officers taking part. The decision that the invasion of Europe would take place in Normandy was made at this conference. King Haakon VII of Norway, then in exile in Britain due to the German occupation of his kingdom, visited Largs in 1944 and was made the town's first honorary citizen.

Largs was (from the summer of 2017) the first place in the world to introduce a fully integrated system to activate pedestrian crossings using a series of Neateboxes. This system allows visually or physically impaired persons to activate the crossing button with no actual requirement to find or push the button, and will be of great benefit to the disabled community.

Culture
Largs has hosted the National Mòd in 1956, 1965 and 2002.

Theatres and venues include Barrfields Pavilion and the Vikingar centre.

In 2014, it was rated one of the most attractive postcode areas to live in Scotland.

The town is home to the children's theatre company The McDougalls who have headquarters in the town.

Largs hosts the popular "Largs Live" on the last weekend in June with live music around pubs, restaurants and other venues over Friday, Saturday and Sunday.

Public transport
The town is served by Largs railway station with regular services to and from Glasgow Central station.

Places of interest

Despite its diminished status as a holiday resort, much of Largs is still geared towards tourism. The Vikingar Centre at Barrfields is an interactive look into the history of Viking life; Kelburn Country Centre, Barrfields Pavilion Theatre, Largs Swimming Pool, Douglas Park and Inverclyde National Sports Training Centre are other attractions. Nardinis is a famous ice cream parlour, cafe and restaurant, that dominates the Esplanade and which reopened in late 2008 following clearance from Historic Scotland and major renovation works. St. Columba's Parish Church is situated opposite Nardinis and contains a Heritage Centre. The church itself was built in 1892 and is notable for its stained glass windows and Willis organ.

There is a neolithic tomb behind Douglas Park. Known as the Haylie Chambered Tomb, it was once covered by a cairn of stones (known as Margaret's Law). When it was uncovered in the early twentieth century the tomb was dated to around 3000 to 2000 BC.

Skelmorlie Aisle, adjoining the local museum, is in the care of Historic Scotland and is open during the summer.

Kelburn Castle, situated between Largs and Fairlie, is the ancestral home of the Boyle (originally de Boyville) family, the hereditary Earls of Glasgow. Kelburn is believed to be the oldest castle in Scotland to have been continuously inhabited by the same family. The de Boyvilles who originated in Caen in Normandy came up after the Norman Conquest of England in 1066. The forebears of the modern day Boyles settled at Kelburn around 1140.

The Noddsdale Water flows from the north to reach the sea at the north end of Largs, and Brisbane House sited in the dale about  up the river was the birthplace of the soldier and Governor of New South Wales Sir Thomas Brisbane, whose name was given to the city of Brisbane in Queensland, Australia, and, in 1823, to "Brisbane Water" on the NSW Central Coast. Noddsdale was renamed Brisbane Glen in his honour.

The 'Prophet's Grave' is located in the Brisbane Glen close to Middleton Farm. In 1647 the Reverend William Smith died from the 'plague' whilst ministering to his parishioners who had temporarily forsaken Largs as a result of the aforementioned plague. William asked to be buried in the glen next to the Noddsdale Water and prophesied that if the two rowan trees planted at either end of his grave were prevented from touching then the plague would never return to Largs. The grave is in a delightful spot during the day and was a popular tourist attraction with postcards available and a thorough restoration in 1956. Night visits, however, have resulted in reports of ghost sightings and unusual phenomenon. The prophecy has been of debatable efficacy. However it has meant that his grave has been well looked after for around four hundred years.

A Caledonian MacBrayne ferry service runs from Largs to Great Cumbrae, and the paddle steamer Waverley also calls in at the pier during cruises. The town is served by Largs railway station on the railway line from Glasgow to North Ayrshire (the Ayrshire Coast Line), and also lies on the main A78 road. It remains a popular destination for holiday-makers and weekenders from Glasgow all year round.

Notable people

Alan J. Jamieson, scientist, was born in Largs.
Benny Gallagher of Gallagher and Lyle was born in the town and has held Songwriting Masterclasses in the Vikingar to encourage local musicians to embrace their talent.
Daniela Nardini actress, was born in Largs.
Graham Lyle was brought up in the town.
John Sessions, comedian, most known for regular appearances on Whose Line is it Anyway? and QI.
Lord Kelvin (William Thomson) lived in Largs, in Netherall mansion, and died there in 1907.
Sam Torrance, golfer, was born in Largs.

Twin towns
Andernos-les-Bains, Gironde, France.

Climate

Largs has an oceanic climate (Köppen: Cfb'').

See also
HMS Largs
Largs Academy
Stones of Scotland

References

Further reading

Largs & District by Ian Dalgleish
The Prophet's Grave, Noddsdale, Brisbane Glen
Explore Largs: Promoting everything there is to explore in Largs from shopping, eating out and events & festivals to accommodation, entertainment, historical and cultural
Hotels in Largs : 15+ Hotels in Largs, from the Brisbane House Hotel, Seamill Hydro Hotel to smaller B&Bs. Local knowledge hand picked for you
What's On In Largs : A useful tool giving you easy access to events and promotions in Largs throughout the year.
Largs Alive : What's on guide for events, food and drink in Largs
largs.org : Largs Community Website
Largs Thistle Football Club
LargsOnline.co.uk - The Most Comprehensive Guide to Largs, Ayrshire, Scotland
Vikingar
Largs Old Kirk/Skelmorlie Aisle
Skelmorlie Aisle
Largs Lifeboat
2001 census

External links

Largs Tourism Guide
Video and commentary on the 'Pencil' monument near Largs
Video and commentary on the Battle of Largs 1
Video and commentary on Haco's Standing Stone
Video and commentary on the 'Three Sisters'
Video and commentary on the Haylie Chambered Cairn

 
Ports and harbours of Scotland
Seaside resorts in Scotland
Towns in North Ayrshire
Firth of Clyde
Populated coastal places in Scotland